Flood City Music Festival is an annual music festival held in Johnstown, Pennsylvania, presented by the Johnstown Area Heritage Association.
The festival began in 1989 as a street fair to commemorate the 100th Anniversary of the Johnstown Flood.  The event was renamed the National Folk Festival in 1990, and was held in Johnstown's Cambria City neighborhood from 1990 to 1992. In 1993, it was renamed the Johnstown FolkFest and eventually the festival moved from Cambria City to downtown Johnstown in 2004. The festival emphasized acoustic music, but was expanded and renamed the Flood City Music Festival in 2009 to include other styles of music.

2014 Flood City Music Festival Lineup
 Boz Scaggs
 Leftover Salmon with special guest Bill Payne
  Lee Fields & The Expressions
 Hurray for the Riff Raff
 Dumpstaphunk
 Rubblebucket
 Nahko and Medicine for the People
 Cornmeal
 Big Sam's Funky Nation
 Turkuaz
 The Iguanas
 Nicole Atkins
 Jarekus Singleton
 Driftwood
 Big Mean Sound Machine
 Neon Swing X-perience
 The Greens
 Bastard Bearded Irishmen
 Ikebe Shakedown
 Miss Melanie & the Valley Rats
 City Dwelling Nature Seekers
 Grand Piano
 The Hawkeyes
 Smackdab
 Swampcandy
 Good Brother Earl
 Whiskey River Panhandlers
 The Weathered Road
 Amanda Barton & Bill Ward
 Matt Otis & the Sound
 Striped Maple Hollow
 Tim Woods & the Woods Family Band

2013 Flood City Music Festival Lineup
  Trombone Shorty & Orleans Avenue
 Robert Randolph and the Family Band
 Greensky Bluegrass
  George Porter, Jr. & The Runnin' Pardners
 Kenny Neal
 Bonerama
 Snarky Puppy
 Sister Sparrow & the Dirty Birds
  Chuck Prophet & The Mission Express
 Stephen Kellogg and the Sixers
 Spirit Family Reunion
 Turkuaz
 The Funk Ark
 Sol Driven Train
 Rumpke Mountain Boys
 Alexes Aiken
 Johnny Sketch & the Dirty Notes
 The Kalob Griffin Band
 New York Funk Exchange
 Bastard Bearded Irishmen
 Jazzam featuring Clinton Clegg
 Cait Cuneo
 Tiger Maple String Band
 Maddie Georgi Band
 Old E Allstars
 Well Strung
 600 lbs. of Sin
 The Weedrags
 Midnight Drive
 The Beagle Brothers
 The Derek Woodz Band
 The Pawnbrokers
 The Crew of the Half Moon
 West Hills All-Stars

2012 Flood City Music Festival Lineup
  Dr. John & the Lower 911
 Del McCoury Band
 The Smithereens
 Steve Kimock with special guests Bernie Worrell, Wally Ingram and Andy Hess
 Royal Southern Brotherhood
 Big Sam's Funky Nation
 Sonny Landreth
 Anders Osborne
 Johnny Sketch & The Dirty Notes
 Eric Lindell with Anson Funderburgh
 The Revelations featuring Tre Williams
 Billy Price Band
 Chandler Travis Philharmonic
 Eric Tessmer
 John Howie & the Rosewood Bluff
 The New York Funk Exchange
 Yellow Dubmarine
 Jimmy Adler
 One World Tribe
 Moon River Ramblers
 Fletcher’s Grove
 Jazzam
 Backstabbing Good People
 Gypsy & His Band of Ghosts
 The Harlan Twins
 JKutchma & the Five Fifths
 Whiskey River Panhandlers
 Charlie Dane
 Shiva Skydriver
 Groove Gathering
 Chris Vipond and the Stanley Street Band

2011 Flood City Music Festival Lineup
 Gregg Allman
 JJ Grey & MOFRO
 Bettye LaVette
 Black Joe Lewis & the Honeybears
 Project/Object featuring Ike Willis & Ray White
 Terrance Simien and the Zydeco Experience
 The Bridge
 Tab Benoit
 The Pimps of Joytime
  Bill Kirchen & Too Much Fun
 Brothers Past
 The Hackensaw Boys
 Lubriphonic
 That 1 Guy
 Boogie Hustlers
 Sister Sparrow & the Dirty Birds
 American Babies
 Sweet Earth
 Shelf Life String Band
 City Dwelling Nature Seekers
 600 Lbs. of Sin
 Clinton Clegg & the Backstabbing Good People
 Black Coffee
 Southside Strays
 Jeff Perigo & Friends

2010 Flood City Music Festival Lineup
 Los Lobos
 Galactic with special guests Cyril Neville and Corey Henry
  Robert Cray Band
 Anders Osborne
 Honeytribe
 The Lee Boys
 Los Straitjackets
 Billy Price Band
 Eilen Jewell
 Eric Tessmer Band
 Boogie Hustlers
 Jimmy Adler Band
 Boca Chica
 Tim Dabbs
 Corned Beef & Curry
 Good Brother Earl
 Moon River Ramblers
 Mark Dignam
 Rising Regina
 Dave DiStefano & the West Hills All-Stars
 The Bogarts
 The Weathered Road

2009 Flood City Music Festival Lineup
 The Derek Trucks Band
 Grace Potter and the Nocturnals
 Donna the Buffalo
 Ruthie Foster
 Seven Nations
  Bill Kirchen & the Hammer of the Honky-Tonk Gods
 Kane Welch Kaplin
 Scott Blasey
 Scrapomatic
 Clumsy Lovers
 Todd Wolfe
 Ernie Hawkins
 Bill Deasy
 Kristi Rose & Fats Kaplin
 Ben Hardt Acoustic
 The NewLanders
 Bob Banerjee & Friends
 Gerry Stanek
 Gypsy Dave & the Stumpjumpers
 Bill Toms
 Joy Ike
 The Turpentiners
 Brad Yoder
 Maddie Georgi
 Heather Kropf
 Jazz In Your Face
 Endless Mike & the Beagle Club
 Miner Swing Quartet
 Tree
 Whiskey River Panhandlers

2008 AmeriServ Johnstown Folkfest Lineup
 Jason & the Scorchers
 Del Castillo
 Tom Russell
  Webb Wilder & the Beatnecks
 Dwayne Dopsie & the Zydeco Hellraisers
 Amy LaVere
  Jason Ricci & New Blood
 Shannon Whitworth
 Big Sam's Funky Nation
  Deke Dickerson & the Ecco-Fonics
 Barrence Whitfield
 Stacie Collins
 Jordan Valentine & the Sunday Saints
 Born Again Floozies
 Dallas Wayne
 Jason Ringenberg
 Tim Dabbs
 Red Collar
 The Marauders
 Arty Hill and the Long Gone Daddies
 Dubmissive
 Aran
 Rusty Gun Revival
 Jazz In Your Face
 Beagle Brothers

2007 AmeriServ Johnstown Folkfest Lineup
 A. J. Croce
 The Tossers
 Dwayne Dopsie & the Zydeco Hellraisers
 Slavic Soul Party!
 Eric Lindell
 Scott Miller & the Commonwealth
 Bill Kirchen
 Tres Chicas
 Too Slim and the Taildraggers
 Druhá Tráva
 Last Train Home
 James Talley
 Bill Deasy
 Gigi Dover & The Big Love
 The Marauders
 Jimmy Adler
 Grinning Mob
 McKay Brothers
 Jimmy Sapienza & 5 Guys Named Moe
 Jennifer Drummey & the Small Band
 Jazz In Your Face

2006 AmeriServ Johnstown Folkfest Lineup
 Balkan Beat Box
 The Recipe
 Sleepy LaBeef
 Bonerama
  Terrance Simien & the Zydeco Experience
 Maia Sharp
 The Lee Boys
 Billy Price Band
 The Irish Descendants
  Joe Grushecky & the Houserockers
 Eric Tessmer Band
 Those Darn Accordions
 Doll Hospital
 Gamble Brothers Band
 Will Hawkins
 Mark Dignam
 Tim Dabbs
 Rusty Gun Revival
 The Gospel Lights
 Russell Lauf Band
 Rachel Allen
 Jazz in Your Face

2005 AmeriServ Johnstown Folkfest Lineup
 Sharon Jones & The Dap-Kings
 Wanda Jackson
 Rosie Flores
 Brave Combo
 Cephas & Wiggins
 Jason Ringenberg
 Lil' Brian & the Zydeco Travelers
 Chandler Travis Philharmonic
  Paul Cebar & the Milwaukeeans
 Red Elvises
 Redbird
 Peter Mulvey
 Kris Delmhorst
 Jeffrey Foucault
 The Kissers
 The Greyhounds
 The Gospel Lights
 "Farmer Jason" Ringenberg
 Soda Jerk
 Tim Dabbs
 Jazz in Your Face
 Angelo M
 Russell Lauf Band
 The Rhinelanders

2004 AmeriServ Johnstown Folkfest Lineup
 Seven Nations
 Chubby Carrier and the Bayou Swamp Band
  Jimmy Sturr & His Orchestra
  Walter "Wolfman" Washington & The Roadmasters
 Chris Smither
 Big Sandy & His Fly-Rite Boys
 Bill Kirchen
  Barrence Whitfield & The Savages
 The Recipe
 Hot Club Sandwich
 Anne McCue
 Two Dollar Pistols
 Ernie Hawkins
 Big Leg Emma
 The Gospel Lights
 Del Sinchak Band
 Little Buddy
 The Mavens
 Grinning Mob
 The NewLanders
 Jazz In Your Face

2003 AmeriServ Johnstown Folkfest Lineup
 The Louisiana Blues Throwdown featuring Harry Hypolite, Mathilda Jones, Eric Lindell and the Marc Stone Band
 Alex Torres y los Reyes Latinos
 The Prodigals
 Those Darn Accordions
 Wayne "The Train" Hancock
  Deke Dickerson and the Ecco-Fonics
 The Cool John Ferguson Band
 Red Meat
 Chandler Travis Philharmonic
 Two High String Band
 Caroline Herring
 Cootie Stark
 Tarbox Ramblers
 Peter Mulvey
 Jazz in Your Face
 Del Sinchak
 The Newlanders
 The Delaneys
 Ribbon Grass
 John Charney with White Mojo and Friends
 John Stevens' Doubleshot
 The Johnstown Button Box Band
 Polka Express

2002 AmeriServ Johnstown Folkfest Lineup
  Terrance Simien and the Mallet Playboys
 Asylum Street Spankers
 Bio Ritmo
 Robbie Fulks
 Michelle Willson and the Evil Gal Orchestra
 The Campbell Brothers
 Greg Trooper
 Ernie Hawkins
 Hot Club Sandwich
 Countdown Quartet
 Dog Run Boys
 Hooley
 Boilermaker Jazz Band
 Tim Dabbs
 Jolly Joe and the Bavarians

2001 AmeriServ Johnstown Folkfest Lineup
 Southern Culture on the Skids
 Nathan and the Zydeco Cha-Chas
  Jimmy Thackery and the Drivers
 Pucho & His Latin Soul Brothers
 Acoustic Syndicate
 Bonnie Rideout
  Ray Condo and the Ricochets
  Barrence Whitfield and the Groove Juice Symphony
  Dallas Wayne and the Hardcases
 Christy McWilson
 Hugh Feeley and Talk is Cheap
 Walt Wagner and the Polka Serenaders
 Die Schlauberger
 Simple Gifts
 Dead Irish Blues Band
 The Fabulous Gunslingers
 Gospel Lights

2000 AmeriServ Johnstown Folkfest Lineup
 Buckwheat Zydeco
 The Seldom Scene
 Miss Lavelle White
 Those Darn Accordions
 The Prodigals
 Chris Smither
 Ronnie Dawson
 Wendell Rivera's Latin Jazz All-Stars
 Tim Dabbs
 The Irish Descendants
 Earthtones
 Dead Irish Blues
 Crusade with Ed Biegaj

1999 AmeriServ Johnstown Folkfest Lineup
 Alex Torres and the Latin Kings
 Sleepy LaBeef
 Cephas & Wiggins
 The Holmes Brothers
  Don Walser and the Pure Texas Band
 Neil Anderson and Full Circle
 Jimmy Sapienza and Five Guys Named Moe
 Rank Outsiders
 Heather Eatman
 The Hot Club of Cowtown
 Hart-Rouge

1998 AmeriServ Johnstown Folkfest Lineup
 Walter "Wolfman" Washington
 Austin Lounge Lizards
  Terrance Simien and the Mallet Playboys
 Corey Harris
 Mamou
 Cherish the Ladies
 Asylum Street Spankers
 Trout Fishing in America
 Steel Impressions
 Jimmy Sapienza and the Swingmeisters
 Bill Bevac Band
 Mon Gumbo

1997 AmeriServ Johnstown Folkfest Lineup
  Laurie Lewis and Grant Street
 Tab Benoit
 Los Pinkys
 Solas
 Rank Outsiders
 Lil Brian and the Zydeco Travelers
 The Gathering Field
 Del Sinchak
 The Englishmen
 Code Blue
 Kevin Roth

1996 AmeriServ Johnstown Folkfest Lineup
 Fat Possum Mississippi Juke Joint Caravan with R. L. Burnside, Dave Thompson and Junior Kimbrough
 The Persuasions
 Nathan and the Zydeco Cha-Chas
 Beaver Creek
  Don Walser and the Pure Texas Band
 Clan Na Gael
 Galla & Dan
 Earthtones
 Grooveyard
 The Braxmen
 Eddie and the Slovenes

1995 AmeriServ Johnstown Folkfest Lineup
 Maggie Christl
 Green Fields of America
 C.J. Chenier and the Red Hot Louisiana Band
 Tim & Mollie O'Brien and The O'Boys
 Sleepy LaBeef
 The Dixie Hummingbirds
 Phillip Fankhauser and the Checkerboard Blues Band
 The Grace Family
 Heather Eatman
 Joe Grkman Band

1994 AmeriServ Johnstown Folkfest Lineup
 Johnny Clyde Copeland
  Jimmy Thackery and the Drivers
  Chubby Carrier and the Bayou Swamp Band
 Alex Torres and the Latin Kings
 J.D. Crowe and the New South
  Lenny Gomulka's Chicago Push
 Jimmy Sapienza and Five Guys Named Moe
 Casco Bay Tummlers
 John Bagnato Quartet

1993 Johnstown Folkfest Lineup
 Clarence "Gatemouth" Brown
 Kukuruza
 Áine Minogue
  Rockin' Dopsie and the Zydeco Twisters
 Queen Bee & the Blue Hornet Band
 Glorius Rebirth
 Drums for Peace
 Dynabrass
 Douglas Miller

1992 National Folk Festival Lineup
  Terrance Simien and the Mallet Playboys
 The Blind Boys of Alabama
 Fontella Bass
 Southern Scratch
 Warner Williams
 Eddie Pennington
 Melvin Wine
 Chatuye
 Shashmaqam
 Big Joe Duskin
 Brendon Mulvihill
 Gillis Brothers

1991 National Folk Festival Lineup
 The Fairfield Four
 Walter Mouton and the Scott Playboys
 Wayne Henderson
 Roman Ritachka
 Los Pleneros del Batey
 Ganga
 Ceilidh House
 Tony Ellis
 Etta Baker
 Sun Rhythm Section

1990 National Folk Festival Lineup
 The Holmes Brothers
 Lyman Enloe
 Liz Carroll
 Billy McComskey and Dáithí Sproule
 Otonowa
 Cephas & Wiggins
 Preston Frank and the Zydeco Family Band
 Moses Rascoe
 Charlie "Possum" Walden
 Bud Hudenski and the Corsairs

References

External links

Rock festivals in the United States
Music festivals in Pennsylvania
Johnstown, Pennsylvania
1989 establishments in Pennsylvania
Tourist attractions in Cambria County, Pennsylvania
Music festivals established in 1989
Folk festivals in the United States